The Printer's Devil is a 1923 American silent drama film directed by William Beaudine and released by Warner Bros. It stars Wesley Barry, Harry Myers, and Kathryn McGuire.

Plot
As described in a film magazine review, Brick Hubbard, a printer's devil, induces Sidney Fletcher to buy the town newspaper, The Gazette. An editorial written by Sidney arouses the wrath of the town banker Ira Gates, whose daughter Vivian is whom Sidney loves. When the bank is robbed, Sidney is suspected. Though the efforts of Brick the actual criminals are arrested and Sidney wins the affection of Vivian.

Cast

Reception
According to Warner Bros. records, the film earned $243,000 domestically and $20,000 foreign.

References

External links

1923 films
1923 comedy-drama films
American silent feature films
American black-and-white films
Films directed by William Beaudine
Warner Bros. films
1920s American films
Silent American comedy-drama films
1920s English-language films